Kulajda is a Czech cuisine soup. An "updated" version is made with sour cream, potatoes, dill and quail egg. Mushrooms are also an important ingredient of the soup.

In some regions another sour mushroom based Czech soup kyselo is mistaken named as kulajda. The difference is that kyselo uses sourdough  and (most of the time) neither sour cream or milk.

References

Czech cuisine
Soups